Statistical software are specialized computer programs for analysis in statistics and econometrics.

Open-source

 ADaMSoft – a generalized statistical software with data mining algorithms and methods for data management
 ADMB – a software suite for non-linear statistical modeling based on C++ which uses automatic differentiation
 Chronux – for neurobiological time series data
 DAP – free replacement for SAS
 Environment for DeveLoping KDD-Applications Supported by Index-Structures (ELKI) a software framework for developing data mining algorithms in Java
 Epi Info – statistical software for epidemiology developed by Centers for Disease Control and Prevention (CDC). Apache 2 licensed
 Fityk – nonlinear regression software (GUI and command line)
 GNU Octave – programming language very similar to MATLAB with statistical features
 gretl – gnu regression, econometrics and time-series library
 intrinsic Noise Analyzer (iNA) – For analyzing intrinsic fluctuations in biochemical systems
 jamovi – A free software alternative to IBM SPSS Statistics
 JASP – A free software alternative to IBM SPSS Statistics with additional option for Bayesian methods
 JMulTi – For econometric analysis, specialised in univariate and multivariate time series analysis
 Just another Gibbs sampler (JAGS) – a program for analyzing Bayesian hierarchical models using Markov chain Monte Carlo developed by Martyn Plummer. It is similar to WinBUGS
 KNIME – An open source analytics platform built with Java and Eclipse using modular data pipeline workflows
 LIBSVM – C++ support vector machine libraries
 mlpack – open-source library for machine learning, exploits C++ language features to provide maximum performance and flexibility while providing a simple and consistent application programming interface (API)
 Mondrian – data analysis tool using interactive statistical graphics with a link to R
 Neurophysiological Biomarker Toolbox – Matlab toolbox for data-mining of neurophysiological biomarkers
 OpenBUGS
 OpenEpi – A web-based, open-source, operating-independent series of programs for use in epidemiology and statistics based on JavaScript and HTML
 OpenMx – A package for structural equation modeling running in R (programming language)
 OpenNN – A software library written in the programming language C++ which implements neural networks, a main area of deep learning research
 Orange, a data mining, machine learning, and bioinformatics software
 Pandas – High-performance computing (HPC) data structures and data analysis tools for Python in Python and Cython (statsmodels, scikit-learn)
 Perl Data Language – Scientific computing with Perl
 Ploticus – software for generating a variety of graphs from raw data
 PSPP – A free software alternative to IBM SPSS Statistics
 R – free implementation of the S (programming language)
 Programming with Big Data in R (pbdR) – a series of R packages enhanced by SPMD parallelism for big data analysis
 R Commander – GUI interface for R
 Rattle GUI – GUI interface for R
 Revolution Analytics – production-grade software for the enterprise big data analytics
 RStudio – GUI interface and development environment for R
 ROOT – an open-source C++ system for data storage, processing and analysis, developed by CERN and used to find the Higgs boson
 Salstat – menu-driven statistics software
 Scilab – uses GPL-compatible CeCILL license
 SciPy – Python library for scientific computing that contains the stats sub-package which is partly based on the venerable |STAT (a.k.a. PipeStat, formerly UNIX|STAT) software
 scikit-learn – extends SciPy with a host of machine learning models (classification, clustering, regression, etc.)
 statsmodels – extends SciPy with statistical models and tests (regression, plotting, example datasets, generalized linear model (GLM), time series analysis, autoregressive–moving-average model (ARMA), vector autoregression (VAR), non-parametric statistics, ANOVA, empirical likelihood)
 Shogun (toolbox) – open-source, large-scale machine learning toolbox that provides several SVM (Support Vector Machine) implementations (like libSVM, SVMlight) under a common framework and interfaces to Octave, MATLAB, Python, R
 Simfit – simulation, curve fitting, statistics, and plotting
 SOCR
 SOFA Statistics – desktop GUI program focused on ease of use, learn as you go, and beautiful output
 Stan (software) – open-source package for obtaining Bayesian inference using the No-U-Turn sampler, a variant of Hamiltonian Monte Carlo. It is somewhat like BUGS, but with a different language for expressing models and a different sampler for sampling from their posteriors
 Statistical Lab – R-based and focusing on educational purposes
 TOPCAT (software) – interactive graphical analysis and manipulation package for astronomers that understands FITS, VOTable and CDF formats.
 Torch (machine learning) – a deep learning software library written in Lua (programming language)
 Weka (machine learning) – a suite of machine learning software written at the University of Waikato

Public domain
 CSPro (core is public domain but without publicly available source code; the web UI has been open sourced under Apache version 2 and the help system under GPL version 3)
 Dataplot (NIST)
 X-13ARIMA-SEATS (public domain in the United States only; outside of the United States is under US government copyright)

Freeware
 BV4.1
 GeoDA
 MaxStat Lite – general statistical software
 MINUIT
 WinBUGS – Bayesian analysis using Markov chain Monte Carlo methods
 Winpepi – package of statistical programs for epidemiologists

Proprietary
 Alteryx – analytics platform with drag and drop statistical models; R and Python integration 
 Analytica – visual analytics and statistics package
 Angoss – products KnowledgeSEEKER and KnowledgeSTUDIO incorporate several data mining algorithms
 ASReml – for restricted maximum likelihood analyses
 BMDP – general statistics package
 DataGraph – visual analysis with linear and nonlinear regression
 DB Lytix – 800+ in-database models
 EViews – for econometric analysis
 FAME (database) – a system for managing time-series databases
 GAUSS – programming language for statistics
 Genedata – software for integration and interpretation of experimental data in the life science R&D
 GenStat – general statistics package
 GLIM – early package for fitting generalized linear models
 GraphPad InStat – very simple with much guidance and explanations
 GraphPad Prism – biostatistics and nonlinear regression with clear explanations
 IMSL Numerical Libraries – software library with statistical algorithms
 JMP – visual analysis and statistics package
 LIMDEP – comprehensive statistics and econometrics package
 LISREL – statistics package used in structural equation modeling
 Maple – programming language with statistical features
 Mathematica – a software package with statistical particularly ŋ features
 MATLAB – programming language with statistical features
 MaxStat Pro – general statistical software
 MedCalc – for biomedical sciences
 Microfit – econometrics package,  time series
 Minitab – general statistics package
 MLwiN – multilevel models (free to UK academics)
 Nacsport Video Analysis Software – software for analysing sports and obtaining statistical intelligence 
 NAG Numerical Library – comprehensive math and statistics library
 NCSS – general statistics package
 Neural Designer – commercial deep learning package
 NLOGIT – comprehensive statistics and econometrics package
 nQuery Sample Size Software – Sample Size and Power Analysis Software
 O-Matrix – programming language
 OriginPro – statistics and graphing, programming access to NAG library
 PASS Sample Size Software (PASS) – power and sample size software from NCSS
 Plotly – plotting library and styling interface for analyzing data and creating browser-based graphs. Available for R, Python, MATLAB, Julia, and Perl
 Primer-E Primer – environmental and ecological specific
 PV-WAVE – programming language comprehensive data analysis and visualization with IMSL statistical package
 Qlucore Omics Explorer – interactive and visual data analysis software
 RapidMiner – machine learning toolbox
 Regression Analysis of Time Series (RATS) – comprehensive econometric analysis package
 Rguroo Statistical Software - An online statistical software designed for teaching and analyzing data 
 S-PLUS – general statistics package
 SAS (software) – comprehensive statistical package
 SHAZAM (Econometrics and Statistics Software) – comprehensive econometrics and statistics package
 SigmaStat – package for group analysis
 Simul – econometric tool for multidimensional (multi-sectoral, multi-regional) modeling
 SmartPLS – statistics package used in partial least squares path modeling (PLS) and PLS-based structural equation modeling
 SOCR – online tools for teaching statistics and probability theory
 Speakeasy (computational environment) – numerical computational environment and programming language with many statistical and econometric analysis features
 SPSS Modeler – comprehensive data mining and text analytics workbench
 SPSS Statistics – comprehensive statistics package
 Stata – comprehensive statistics package
 StatCrunch – comprehensive statistics package, originally designed for college statistics courses
 Statgraphics – general statistics package to include cloud computing and Six Sigma for use in business development, process improvement, data visualization and statistical analysis, design of experiment, point processes, geospatial analysis, regression, and time series analysis are all included within this complete statistical package.
 Statistica – comprehensive statistics package
 StatsDirect – statistics package designed for biomedical, public health and general health science uses
 StatXact – package for exact nonparametric and parametric statistics
 SuperCROSS – comprehensive statistics package with ad-hoc, cross tabulation analysis
 Systat – general statistics package
 The Unscrambler – free-to-try commercial multivariate analysis software for Windows
 Unistat – general statistics package that can also work as Excel add-in
WarpPLS – statistics package used in structural equation modeling
 Wolfram Language – the computer language that evolved from the program Mathematica. It has similar statistical capabilities as Mathematica.
 World Programming System (WPS) – statistical package that supports the use of Python, R and SAS languages within in a single user program.
 XploRe

Add-ons
 Analyse-it – add-on to Microsoft Excel for statistical analysis
 Statgraphics Sigma Express – add-on to Microsoft Excel for Six Sigma statistical analysis
 SUDAAN – add-on to SAS and SPSS for statistical surveys
 XLfit add-on to Microsoft Excel for curve fitting and statistical analysis

See also
 Comparison of statistical packages
 Free statistical software
 List of computer algebra systems
 List of information graphics software
 List of numerical libraries
 List of numerical-analysis software
 Mathematical software
 Psychometric software

References

External links

 

Statistical packages
 
Software